Elisabeth of Austria may refer to:

People
 Elisabeth of Austria (died 1107), daughter of Leopold II, Margrave of Austria
 Elisabeth of Austria (1124–1143), daughter of Leopold III, Margrave of Austria; wife of Hermann II of Winzenburg
 Elisabeth of Austria, Duchess of Lorraine (c. 1285–1353), daughter of Albert I of Germany, Duke of Austria; wife of Frederick IV, Duke of Lorraine
 Elizabeth of Austria (1436–1505), daughter of Albert II of Germany; Queen consort of Casimir IV of Poland and Lithuania
 Isabella of Austria (1501–1526), Queen of Denmark, Norway and Sweden; widely known also as Elizabeth
 Elizabeth of Austria (1526–1545), daughter of Ferdinand I, Holy Roman Emperor; Queen consort of Sigismund II Augustus of Poland
 Elisabeth of Austria, Queen of France (1554–1592), daughter of Maximilian II, Holy Roman Emperor; Queen consort of Charles IX of France
 Archduchess Maria Elisabeth of Austria (governor) (1680–1741), governor of the Austrian Netherlands between 1725 and 1741
 Archduchess Maria Elisabeth of Austria (born 1743) (1743–1808), archduchess of Austria and princess of Tuscany
 Archduchess Elisabeth Franziska of Austria (1831–1903), daughter of Archduke Joseph, Palatine of Hungary; wife first of Archduke Ferdinand Karl Viktor of Austria-Este & second of Archduke Karl Ferdinand of Austria
 Empress Elisabeth of Austria (1837–1898), daughter of Duke Maximilian Joseph in Bavaria; wife of Emperor Franz Joseph I 
 Archduchess Elisabeth Amalie of Austria (1878–1960), daughter of Archduke Charles Louis of Austria; wife of Prince Aloys of Liechtenstein
 Archduchess Elisabeth Marie of Austria (1883–1963), daughter of Rudolf, Crown Prince of Austria; wife first of Otto Weriand of Windisch-Grätz, second of Leopold Petznek
 Archduchess Elisabeth Franziska of Austria (1892–1930), daughter of Archduke Franz Salvator of Austria; wife of Georg Graf von Waldburg zu Zeil und Hohenems
 Archduchess Elisabeth of Austria (1922–1993), daughter of Emperor Charles I of Austria; wife of Prince Heinrich of Liechtenstein

Other uses
 Elisabeth of Austria (film), a 1931 German film by Adolf Trotz starring Lil Dagover